Mycula is a monotypic genus of European dwarf spiders containing the single species, Mycula mossakowskii. It was first described by H.-B. Schikora in 1994, and has only been found in Austria, Germany, and Italy.

See also
 List of Linyphiidae species (I–P)

References

Linyphiidae
Monotypic Araneomorphae genera